The Paul Street Boys is a youth novel by the Hungarian writer Ferenc Molnár, first published in 1906.

Plot outline

The novel is about schoolboys in Józsefváros neighbourhood of Budapest and set in 1889. The Paul Street Boys spend their free time at the grund, an empty lot that they regard as their "Fatherland". The story has two main protagonists, János Boka (the honourable leader of the Paul Street Boys) and Ernő Nemecsek (the smallest member of the group).

When the "Redshirts"—another gang of boys, led by Feri Áts, who gather at the nearby botanical gardens—attempt to take over the grund, the Paul Street Boys are forced to defend themselves in military fashion.

Although the Paul Street Boys win the war, and little Nemecsek repeatedly demonstrates that his bravery and loyalty surpasses his size, the book ends in tragedy: Nemecsek dies of the pneumonia that he caught in the conflict.

Literary significance and criticism

Very popular in Hungary, it is considered as a classic book, and it is also one of the most famous Hungarian novels outside the country. It has been translated into many languages, and in several countries, it is a mandatory or recommended reading in schools. The first English translation was made by Louis Rittenberg and published in 1927, and later revised by George Szirtes for a re-release in 1994.

Erich Kästner took up the theme of two groups of boys conducting a "war" and using all the terminology of militarism and nationalism in The Flying Classroom, published just before the Nazi Party won elections in Germany. Kästner was, however, less harsh with the character resembling Nemecsek, who in Kästner's version suffers no more than a broken leg.

In Croatia, the book is part of book report curriculum, and is very popular among elementary school pupils (a 2016 scholarly poll of 6th and 7th graders in Split found it to be comparable to Harry Potter and Diary of a Wimpy Kid), and there have been multiple translations, the differences between which have attracted some scholarly attention.

In Israel, the book is considered a classic youth novel. A Hebrew version titled Mahanaim (Camps — also referencing a popular ball game) was published in 1940 and was popular for many years, with multiple reprints. A newer translation titled "The Boys from Paul Street" was published in 1984. A stage adaptation of the book by the Kibbutz theater started performing in 2016.

In Azerbaijan, the book became popular after Ramil Safarov translated it into the Azerbaijani language during his sentence in Budapest.

In Mongolia, the book was published in April 2020 and the Translation team (to Mongolian) was awarded the Hungarian Order of Merit by the decree of the President of Hungary on September 21, 2021.

Film, TV or theatrical adaptations

A Pál utcai fiúk — silent film (Hungary, 1917), directed by Béla Balogh — First version of the story by Hungarian director Béla Balogh.
A Pál utcai fiúk — silent film (Hungary, 1924), directed by Béla Balogh, with György Faragó (Nemecsek), Ernő Verebes (Boka), Ferenc Szécsi (Geréb), István Barabás (Feri Áts), Frigyes Pártos (Csónakos). — Second version of the story by Hungarian director Béla Balogh.
No Greater Glory — film (USA, 1934), directed by Frank Borzage and released by Columbia Pictures, with George P. Breakston (Nemecsek), Jimmy Butler (Boka), Jackie Searl (Geréb), Frankie Darro (Feri Áts), Donald Haines (Csónakos).
I ragazzi della via Paal — film (Italy, 1935), directed by Alberto Mondadori and Mario Monicelli, with Giulio Tamagnini (Nemecsek), Alberto Vigevani (Boka), Giulio Macchi (Geréb), Bruno Aghion (Feri Áts), Carlo Cartigliani (Csónakos). 
A Pál-utcai fiúk — film (Hungary-USA, 1969), directed by Zoltán Fábri, with Anthony Kemp (Nemecsek), William Burleigh (Boka), John Moulder-Brown (Geréb), Julien Holdaway (Feri Áts), Robert Efford (Csónakos). - The film was nominated for the Academy Award for Best Foreign Language Film. 
I ragazzi della via Pal — TV film (Italy-Austria-Germany-Hungary, 2003), directed by Maurizio Zaccaro, with Gáspár Mesés (Nemecsek), Gáspár Csaba (Boka), Gergely Mészáros (Geréb), Daniel Lugosi (Feri Áts), Péter Ványi (Csónakos).
A Pál-utcai fiúk — TV film (Hungary, 2005), directed by Ferenc Török, with Balázs Bojtár (Nemecsek), Krisztián Fekete (Boka), Milán Király (Geréb), Csaba Csuhai Csinos (Feri Áts), Róbert Rostási (Csónakos).

See also

Other European books depicting "war" between rival groups of boys
 The Flying Classroom
 War of the Buttons

Brazilian Band IRA! made reference to this novel in their song "Rua Paulo" from their album entitled "Meninos da Rua Paulo"

Further reading
 Chapter One of The Paul Street Boys

References

1906 novels
Hungarian novels
Literary works by Ferenc Molnár
Novels set in Budapest
Young adult novels
Novels set in the 19th century
Hungarian novels adapted into films
Hungarian children's literature
1906 children's books
Novels set in the 1880s